Carl Lewis Hamilton (February 23, 1888 – May 27, 1946) was an American businessman. He is most notable for his work as a senior executive of the Weyerhaeuser wood products company and a named partner of the Booz Allen Hamilton management and information technology consulting firm.

Biography
Carl Lewis Hamilton was born in Dubuque, Iowa on February 23, 1888, the son of Dr. Charles H. Hamilton and Mathilda Heberling (Lewis) Hamilton. He graduated from Dubuque High School in 1906, from the University of Minnesota with a Bachelor of Science degree in forestry in 1911. During his time in college, Hamilton worked as an agent for a West Virginia timber, land, and rock company. In the years immediately following his graduation, he was the general sales manager for a Minnesota lumber distributor, and manager for a lumber company with operations in Costa Rica.

In 1915, Hamilton joined Weyerhaeuser. Originally the general manager of the Weyerhaeuser Forest Products subsidiary, he advanced through the ranks to become vice president and general manager of the Weyerhaeuser General Timber Service Company.

Hamilton joined Booz & Fry Surveys as a partner in 1935. During World War II, Hamilton led Booz & Fry's successful effort to obtain management services work in the defense industry, including personnel management for the United States Cartridge Company in St. Louis.

Hamilton's most lasting legacy at Booz, Allen & Hamilton was the creation and implementation of the company's initial code of ethics. His effort to codify the importance of corporate integrity and fair behavior was one of the first adopted by a U.S. corporation, and became a model that many other businesses emulated.

During Hamilton's tenure, the Booz & Fry company became first Booz, Fry, Allen & Hamilton. After George Fry left the company in 1942, it became Booz, Allen & Hamilton. In the mid 1970s, the company was renamed as Booz Allen Hamilton.

Death and burial
Hamilton died of a heart attack at his home in Winnetka, Illinois on May 27, 1946. He was buried at Graceland Cemetery in Chicago.

Family
Hamilton was the husband of Marjorie Atwood. They were the parents of son Charles (1917-1995) and daughter Marjorie (b. 1918), the wife of William Noble Lane (1917-1978).

References

Sources

Books

News sites

Internet

Newspapers

1888 births
1946 deaths
People from Dubuque, Iowa
People from Winnetka, Illinois
University of Minnesota College of Food, Agricultural and Natural Resource Sciences alumni
20th-century American businesspeople
American consultants
Weyerhaeuser
Booz Allen Hamilton people
Burials at Graceland Cemetery (Chicago)